Standerton is a large commercial and agricultural town lying on the banks of the Vaal River in Mpumalanga, South Africa, which specialises in cattle, dairy, maize and poultry farming. The town was established in 1876 and named after Boer leader Commandant A. H. Stander. During the First Boer War a British garrison in the town was besieged by the Boers for three months. General Jan Smuts won this seat during elections and went on to assist in setting up the League of Nations. Standerton is part of the Lekwa Local Municipality.

History
Standerton was founded in 1878 on a farm called Grootverlangen and named after its owner Commandant Adriaan Henrik Stander. The South African Republic's Volksraad approved the formation of a town at the drift in 1876 and proclaimed two years later. It was granted municipal status in 1903. The crossing over the Vaal River, now bridged, was known as Stander's Drift and a hill close to the town was called Standerskop were also named after Stander. During the First Boer War (1880–81), a British unit was besieged by the Boer forces who shelled them from the nearby hill, the former holding out until the end of the war in February 1881.

Great Trek memorial controversy
The town has received nationwide media attention in 2007 and 2008 following the destruction of an important voortrekker memorial. This monument, located near the facade of the municipality building, was constructed by Afrikaners to mark the 150th anniversary of the Great Trek. The Lekwa municipality's mayor Queen Radebe-Khumalo ordered the structure demolished in April 2007. "That piece of thing means nothing to us. It's just a piece of cement with tracks. I do not even know where it comes from", Radebe-Khumalo declared in a statement quoted by the Beeld newspaper.

The incident led to widespread condemnation by the local Afrikaans community. Jan Bosman, a spokesperson for the Afrikanerbond, claimed that "actions like these undo the spirit of reconciliation as promoted by former president Nelson Mandela and Archbishop Desmond Tutu". In June 2007, a joint initiative between AfriForum and Solidarity lodged an application to the Pretoria High Court requesting that the mayor offer compensation for damages claimed. A subsequent court order ruled that Radebe-Khumalo and her municipality would pay for the damage and prohibited attempts to remove another statue erected in memory of Anglo-Boer war concentration camp victims. 

In May 2010, the memorial was rebuilt on its original site.

Sakhile Township riots
The township of Sakhile near Standerton was the site of violent, service delivery riots that led to the Lekwa Municipality mayor Juliet Queen Radebe-Khumalo and other senior municipal officials, being recalled by the African National Congress in October 2009. The riots included the burning of tyres and blocking some entries to the town.

Economy

Agriculture
The area around the town promotes mixed agriculture with crops such as maize, sunflower seeds, ground nuts and potatoes. Poultry and dairy farming is also conducted in the region.

Manufacturing

Standerton Mills
Standerton Mills Pty Ltd was established in 1947. Mainly manufacturing and supplying yarn and woven industrial fabrics.

Education

Schools
Standerton Primary School is a school that was officially opened in the year 1959, with its first acting principal being Miss C. Fisher and a total of 153 learners after its initial opening.  The school anthem was composed by one Joan Whitington.  The new hall is called the Barbara Dunbar Hall.  There are three houses called Hawks, Eagles and Falcons.  The school motto is "Sapienta Vincit" (Latin for "Wisdom Conquers").  The key on the school badge represents unlocking knowledge.  The official school colours are blue, red and yellow.  The current principal is Mr C. J. van Vuuren.

Khula-Sakhile Secondary School is a school that had been struggling for years with their matriculants' results when finally in the 2013-14 matric group, the school managed to score a 100% pass rate which was seen as a very proud moment for both the Sakhile area as well as the Mpumalanga province as a whole.

Infrastructure

Dams
Grootdraai Dam is situated in the upper reaches of the Vaal River less than 10 km upstream of Standerton. It has a catchment area of 8,195 km2, a mean annual precipitation of approximately 750 mm, a mean annual potential evaporation at the dam site of 1,400 mm and a natural inflow of 580 million m3/a. The full supply capacity of the reservoir is 364 million m3. The Grootdraai dam was completed in 1982.

Notable people
Although Standerton is a rural town surviving mainly on agriculture, it has produced talented people prominent in South African society.

Arnold S de Beer - journalist and academic
Pieter Hendriks - South Africa national rugby team player
Angel Khanyile - member of the National Assembly of South Africa. Shadow Minister of Home Affairs
Jaco Kriel - South Africa national rugby team player
Mark Lawrence - retired international rugby union referee. He refereed his first international test match, in 2000, and was chosen to officiate at both the 2003 Rugby World Cup [2] and 2007 Rugby World Cups.
Frans Lourens Herman Rumpff - Chief Justice of South Africa, 1974-1982
Rooi Mahamutsa - South African football defender for Premier Soccer League club, Free State Stars F.C. and South Africa also played for Orlando Pirates.
Mfundo Ndhlovu - South Africa national rugby sevens team player
JC Ritchie - professional golfer
Gary Van Aswegen - Rugby union player
Constand Viljoen - South African military commander.  co-founded the Afrikaner Volksfront (Afrikaner People's Front) and later founded the Freedom Front (now Freedom Front Plus)

References

External links
Interactive Standerton Website
Local Standerton Website
Mayor on demolotion of Voortrekker Monument

Populated places in the Lekwa Local Municipality
Populated places founded by Afrikaners
Second Boer War concentration camps